Sebastiano Ximenes (c. late 16th century) was an Italian banker of Portuguese origin in Florence, and noted patron of the Arts. He bought and later renamed the Florentine palace, Palazzo Ximenes de Sangallo -- still a tourist attraction today.

Sabastiano Ximenes had bought the castle of Sammezzano from Giovanni Jacopo de' Medici. The castle remained in the Ximenes family until the family line died out in 1816.

This particular Ximenes line died out in Italy in 1816, though the name survives in Florence.

References

Italian entry on Sebastiano Ximenes' "Palazzo Ximenes de Sangallo"

Italian bankers
Year of death unknown
Year of birth unknown
16th-century Italian businesspeople